Óscar Francisco García Quintela (born 17 January 1996), commonly known as Pinchi, is a Spanish footballer who plays mainly as a left winger for CD Mirandés, on loan from UD Las Palmas.

Club career
Born in A Coruña, Galicia, Pinchi joined Deportivo de La Coruña's youth setup in 2005 at the age of nine. He made his debut as a senior with the reserves in 2012, representing the side in Tercera División.

Pinchi made his official debut for the first team on 16 December 2015, coming on as a second-half substitute for Luis Alberto in a 1–1 home draw against UE Llagostera, for the season's Copa del Rey. His La Liga debut came on 20 January 2017, replacing Joselu in an away draw against UD Las Palmas for the same scoreline.

On 27 June 2018, Pinchi left Dépor and joined Atlético de Madrid, being assigned to the reserves in Segunda División B. On 19 July of the following year, he agreed to a three-year contract with Segunda División side Extremadura UD.

Pinchi scored his first professional goal on 8 February 2020, netting his team's second in a 2–4 home loss against CD Tenerife. On 12 July, he scored a brace in a 3–2 win at former side Deportivo, and finished the campaign with five goals as his side suffered relegation.

On 9 September 2020, Pinchi was loaned to CF Fuenlabrada in the second division, for one year. The following 19 July, he moved to fellow league team UD Las Palmas on a three-year contract.

On 30 August 2022, Pinchi was loaned to CD Mirandés also in the second division, for one year.

References

External links

1996 births
Living people
Spanish footballers
Footballers from A Coruña
Association football wingers
La Liga players
Segunda División players
Segunda División B players
Tercera División players
Deportivo Fabril players
Deportivo de La Coruña players
Atlético Madrid B players
Extremadura UD footballers
CF Fuenlabrada footballers
UD Las Palmas players
CD Mirandés footballers